Lena Maria Jonna Olin (born 22 March 1955) is a Swedish actress. She has received nominations for an Academy Award, a Golden Globe Award, a BAFTA Award, and a Primetime Emmy Award.

Mentored by filmmaker Ingmar Bergman, she made her screen debut with a small role in his film Face to Face (1976). After graduating from the drama school, Olin joined the Royal Dramatic Theatre, followed by roles in Bergman's films Fanny and Alexander (1982) and After the Rehearsal (1984). She made her international breakthrough with a role of a free-spirited artist in The Unbearable Lightness of Being (1988), which earned her a nomination for the Golden Globe Award for Best Supporting Actress – Motion Picture.

Olin garnered further critical acclaim for her portrayals of a Jewish survivor in the comedy-drama Enemies, A Love Story (1989), for which she received a nomination for the Academy Award for Best Supporting Actress, and an abused wife in the comedy-drama Chocolat (2000), for which she received a nomination for the BAFTA Award for Best Actress in a Supporting Role. Her other film roles include The Adventures of Picasso (1978), Havana (1990), Romeo Is Bleeding (1993), Mr. Jones (1993), The Ninth Gate (1999), Queen of the Damned (2002), Casanova (2005), The Reader (2008), Remember Me (2010), Maya Dardel (2017), and The Artist's Wife (2019).

On television, Olin starred as KGB agent Irina Derevko on the spy thriller Alias (2002–2006), which earned her a nomination for the Primetime Emmy Award for Outstanding Supporting Actress in a Drama Series. Her other television roles include the sitcom Welcome to Sweden (2014–2015), the drama series Riviera (2017–2020), and the drama series Hunters (2020–2023).

Early life
Olin was born March 22, 1955, in Stockholm, Sweden, the youngest of three children of actors Britta Holmberg (1921–2004) and Stig Olin (1920–2008). She studied acting at Sweden's National Academy of Dramatic Art from 1976 to 1979.

In October 1974, at age 19, Olin was crowned Miss Scandinavia 1974 in Helsinki, Finland.

Film career
Olin worked both as a substitute teacher and as a hospital nurse before becoming an actress. Olin performed for over a decade with Sweden's Royal Dramatic Theatre-ensemble (1980–1994) in classic plays by William Shakespeare and August Strindberg, and appeared in smaller roles of several Swedish films directed by Bergman and in productions of Swedish Television's TV-Theatre Company.

Ingmar Bergman cast Olin in Face to Face (1976). A year later, she began acting at the national stage in Stockholm in productions directed by Bergman, and with Bergman's production of King Lear (in which Olin played Cordelia) she toured the world—Paris, Berlin, New York, Copenhagen, Moscow, and Oslo, among others. Critically acclaimed stage performances by Olin at Sweden's Royal Dramatic Theatre included the leading part as The Daughter in A Dream Play by Strindberg, Margarita in the stage adaption of The Master and Margarita by Mikhail Bulgakov, Carlo Goldoni's The Servant of Two Masters, Ann in Edward Bond's Summer, Titania in A Midsummer Night's Dream by Shakespeare, Ben Jonson's The Alchemist, the title role in Ingmar Bergman's rendition of Strindberg's Miss Julie, and her neurotic Charlotte in the contemporary drama Nattvarden (The Last Supper) by Lars Norén.

In 1980, Olin was one of the earliest winners of the Ingmar Bergman Award, initiated in 1978 by the director himself, who was also one of the two judges.

Olin's international debut in a lead role on film was in Bergman's After the Rehearsal (1984). Two years earlier, she appeared in a small role in the same director's Fanny and Alexander. In 1988, Olin starred with Daniel Day-Lewis in her first major part in an English speaking and internationally produced film, The Unbearable Lightness of Being, followed by Sydney Pollack's Havana (1990), Roman Polanski's The Ninth Gate (1999), and many others.

In 1989, Olin earned an Academy Award nomination for Best Supporting Actress for her work in Enemies: A Love Story, in which she portrayed the survivor of a Nazi death camp. In 1994 Olin starred in Romeo Is Bleeding and played what is perhaps her most extreme character to date; the outrageous hit woman Mona Demarkov—still one of the actress's most popular portrayals on film.

Olin and director Lasse Hallström collaborated on the film Chocolat (2000), which received five Academy Award nominations, and on Casanova (2005).

Alias
From 2002 to 2006, Olin appeared opposite Jennifer Garner in her first American television role, starting on the second season of the successful television series Alias as Irina Derevko. For her work on the series, Olin received an Emmy Award nomination for Outstanding Supporting Actress in 2003.

Olin received good reviews for her part in Alias—particularly her chemistry with Victor Garber, who played her former husband and sometime-enemy Jack Bristow—and was rumored to have been offered a salary in excess of US$100,000 per episode to remain part of the cast. She left the show after her first and only season; this was, however, to spend more time with her family in New York.

In May 2005, Olin returned to Alias for a two-episode appearance at the end of the show's fourth season, and subsequently appeared again in the fifth season, initially in a cameo in December 2005, and then following a four-month hiatus she appeared again in April 2006, and for the finale on 22 May 2006.

Recent projects
In 2005, Olin returned to Sweden for a brief period of filming and starred in a supporting role in Danish director Simon Staho's film Bang Bang Orangutang (with a punk music soundtrack by, among others, The Clash and Iggy Pop).

In 2008, Olin had a small but significant role in the Oscar-nominated film The Reader (2008), playing a Jewish survivor of the Auschwitz death march in a trial in the 1960s and the woman's daughter twenty years later.

Between 2014 and 2015, Olin starred in Swedish sitcom Welcome to Sweden.

Lena Olin starred in the US-Polish independent drama film Maya Dardel in the year 2017.

Personal life
Olin has a son, August, from a relationship with actor Örjan Ramberg. Since 1992, she has been married to filmmaker Lasse Hallström, with whom she has a daughter, Tora. They reside in Bedford, New York.

Filmography

Film

Television

References

External links 
 

1955 births
20th-century Swedish actresses
21st-century Swedish actresses
Actresses from Stockholm
Living people
Swedish beauty pageant winners
Swedish emigrants to the United States
Swedish film actresses
Swedish stage actresses
Swedish television actresses